Winiata may refer to

Maharaia Winiata (1912–1960), New Zealand tribal leader, Methodist minister, teacher, anthropologist and broadcaster 
Selica Winiata (born 1986), New Zealand rugby union player
Winiata railway station in New Zealand
Whatarangi Winiata, New Zealand accountant, academic, and Māori leader